Wellywood is an informal name for the city of Wellington, New Zealand. The name—a conflation of Wellington and Hollywood—is a reference to the film production business established in the city by The Lord of the Rings film director Sir Peter Jackson, and Wellington-based special effects companies Weta Workshop and Weta Digital. The businesses operate a number of film-related facilities in the Wellington suburb of Miramar.

In March 2010, the Wellington Airport company announced plans to erect a Hollywood-style sign Wellywood on a hillside next to the Miramar cutting. After the airport considered a range of alternatives, it was announced in May 2011 that the Wellywood sign would be going ahead. However this was met with enormous criticism, and on 1 June 2011 it was announced that a panel would be convened to consider alternative sign options. The panel ran a binding public poll on The Dominion Post website with the 'Wellington Blown Away' design being chosen. The sign was erected 27 July 2012.

See also
List of Hollywood-inspired nicknames
Cinema of New Zealand
Park Road Post
Weta Digital

References

External links
Joint Wellington regional initiative to support Wellywood
Holding back Wellywood Massey University news article
Welcome to Wellywood Article on the premiere of The Lord of the Rings: The Return of the King
Original Anti-Wellywood Facebook page
Wellywood Sign Generator
Wellingtonians Against the Wellywood Sign Facebook page created May 2011

Cinema of New Zealand
New Zealand slang
Wellington City